Hana Knapová (born  1956) is a Czechoslovak former competitive figure skater. She won gold at the 1971 Prague Skate ahead of Anett Pötzsch and silver at the same event in 1974. She finished in the top twelve at two European Championships – 1974 (Zagreb, Yugoslovia) and 1976 (Geneva, Switzerland). She also appeared at the World Championships.

Competitive highlights

References 

1950s births
Czechoslovak female single skaters
Living people
Figure skaters from Prague